Van Ginkel is a Dutch toponymic surname meaning "from/of Ginkel", a region and settlement in the province of Utrecht first mentioned in the year 777. People with this surname include:

Surname
Andrew Van Ginkel (born 1997), American football player
Blanche Lemco van Ginkel (b. 1923), Canadian architect and educator, wife of Sandy
Godard van Ginkel (1644–1703), Dutch field marshal and governor of Utrecht
 (b. 1971), Dutch film director and screenwriter
Marco van Ginkel (b. 1992), Dutch football midfielder
Sandy van Ginkel (1920–2009), Dutch-born Canadian architect and urban planner

See also
Kevin Ginkel (born 1994), American baseball player

References

Dutch-language surnames
Surnames of Dutch origin
Toponymic surnames